The Double Gallant is a 1707 comedy play by the British writer Colley Cibber.

It was originally performed on 1 November 1707 at the Queen's Theatre in the Haymarket with a cast that included Benjamin Johnson as Sir Solomon, Barton Booth as Clerimont, Robert Wilks as Careless, Colley Cibber as Atall, William Bowen as Captain Strut, Henry Norris as Sir Squabble Splithair, George Pack as Saunter, William Bullock as Old Wilful, Richard Cross as Sir Harry Atall, Anne Oldfield as Lady Dainty, Letitia Cross as Lady Sadlife, Jane Rogers as Clarinda, Lucretia Bradshaw as Sylvia and Margaret Saunders as Wishwell.

References

Bibliography
 Burling, William J. A Checklist of New Plays and Entertainments on the London Stage, 1700-1737. Fairleigh Dickinson Univ Press, 1992.
 McGirr, Elaine M. Partial Histories: A Reappraisal of Colley Cibber. Springer, 2016.
 Nicoll, Allardyce. History of English Drama, 1660-1900, Volume 2. Cambridge University Press, 2009.
 Van Lennep, W. The London Stage, 1660-1800: Volume Two, 1700-1729. Southern Illinois University Press, 1960.

1707 plays
Plays by Colley Cibber
West End plays
Comedy plays